Vietnam Multimedia Corporation is a Vietnamese multimedia corporation, founded in February 1988 for the purpose of building television stations. In July 2003, the Vietnam Ministry of Post and Telematics purchased VTC.

Origin 
In February 1988, the Postal Ministry (Vietnam Telecommunications), founded the Factory for Media Equipment Warrantion, owned by Vietnam Television, which later became VTC. In September 1992, VTC became the Investment Company for Development and Technical Information (INTEDICO) under the auspices of the Ministry of Culture (Information). In November 1993, INTEDICO became an investment company for the development of television technology in Vietnam and on 10 December 1996, INTEDICO merged with TELEXIM and RATIMEX companies to become the Vietnam Television Technology Investment and Development Company under the decision number 918 - QD / TC-VTV, made by Vietnam Television. Further statutory changes were made in 2003 (decision number 129/2003/QD- TTg 26 June 2003) and 2005 when INTENDICO became part of a parent state company, the Communication Corporation (decision number 192/2005/QD-TTg 29 July 2005).

Subsidiary companies of Communication Corporation 
Subsidiary companies include:
 VTC Mobile
 VTC Digicom
 VTC Digital
 Digital Television: Previously, VTC Digital Television Station belonged to VTC Multimedia Corporation, from the end of 2013 the station separated from the Corporation and moved to belong to the Ministry of Information and Communications (later moved to belong to Voice of Vietnam).
 VTC Technology and Digital Content Company - VTC Intecom
 Communications Corporation VTC.
 Corporate Solutions Limited, a member of VTC communications technology
 Company Limited, a member of Communications VTC Multimedia Central
 Company Limited, a member of Communications South VTC Multimedia
 Company Television Media Development (CTC)
 Trading Corporation VTC (communications equipment)
 Joint Stock Company VTC (electronic media)
 Electronics Corporation and Vietnam Cable Television
 Service Corporation (international cooperation)
 Company Transfer of TV technology - telecommunications VTC
 Trading Company, the production of commercials and television entertainment VTC
 Communications Corporation Friendship
 VTC School of Communication
 VTC Studio (established February 2010)
 VTC Academy

Online games 
 Africa Team: Masang Soft (6 May 2006). 
 Audition Online: T3 Entertainment and Yedang Online (8 May 2006). In September 2009, VTC and VinaGame disputed the right to issue the game. This triggered the development of Game Gate.
 Cross-fire and MMOFPS Special Force of the FPT (SF); Sudden Attack (SA); the VinaGame; Cross Fire (CF), the VTC game. CF is rated the best of the three games with the highest number of players. 
 FIFA Online 2 (FIFA 1 was commissioned online in Indonesia).
 Atlantica Online, Free MMORPG world's best, 2008. 
 Kart Rider (removed from sale July 2010).

VTC Studio online games 
 Squad: a 3-D first-person shooting game (MMOFPS), built on the game engine, Gamebryo Lightspeed, from Emergent. This is a casual game, presented on a 3D platform and themed with dark navy.
 Generation 3: built on the Microsoft Silverlight platform, tells the story of a make-believe European Middle Ages continent, Okiast, which has three countries, Kalmar, Dargard and Norwales. The players act as military leaders who rise up against corruption in order to untie the lands.
 Colours of Ocean: a free online social growth game for young people.
 Showbiz: a free social game for music lovers.
 Tour 247: a free social game for lovers of tour management.

Other productions 
VTC produces News as newspapers, news programs, TV Journal and online TV; Mobile service loadable images and ringtones; EBank, an online payment portal; Mobile TV and Interactive television.

See also 
 Cinema of Vietnam
 Culture of Vietnam
 Telecommunications in Vietnam
 Media of Vietnam
 Digital television in Vietnam

External links 
 VTC 
 VTC News Site
 VTC Now 
 VTC Digital Satellite TV
 VTC Online
 VTC Intecom

Communications in Vietnam
Mass media companies of Vietnam
Government-owned companies of Vietnam